This is a list of fortifications of Gibraltar.

Barracks
 Bombproof Barracks
 Buena Vista Barracks
 Defensible Barracks
 Grand Casemates
 Lathbury Barracks
 Retrenched Barracks
 South Barracks

Bastions
 Flat Bastion (St Jago's Bastion) [Baluarte de Santiago]
 Hesse's Demi Bastion (Baluarte de San Pedro)
 Jumper's Bastion (North) [Santa Cruz]
 Jumper's Bastion (South)
 King's Bastion, 1773 (Plataforma de San Lorenzo)
 Montagu Bastion (Plataforma de San Andrés)
 North Bastion (Baluarte de San Pablo)
 Orange Bastion, 1877 (Plataforma de Santa Ana)
 South Bastion, 1540 (Baluarte de Nuestra Señora del Rosario)
 Wellington Front North Demi Bastion (Plataforma de San Diego)
 Wellington Front South Demi Bastion (Plataforma de San Francisco)

Batteries

 Engineer Battery
 Europa Advance Batteries
 Europa Batteries
 Europa Pass Batteries
 Farringdon's Battery
 Forbes' Batteries
 Gardiner's Battery
 Genista Battery
 Genoese Batteries
 Governor's Lookout Battery
 Grand Battery (Muralla de San Bernardo)
 Green's Lodge Battery
 Half Way Battery
 Hanover Battery
 Harding's Battery
 Hayne's Cave Battery
 Hutment Battery
 Jews' Cemetery Battery
 Jones' Battery
 King's Lines Battery
 Lady Augusta's Battery
 Lady Louisa's Battery
 Levant Battery
 Lewis' Battery
 Lighthouse Battery
 Little Bay Battery
 Lord Airey's Battery
 Martin's Battery (or Mediterranean Battery)
 Middle Hill Battery
 Mount Misery Battery
 Napier of Magdala Battery
 New Mole Battery
 North Mole Elbow Battery
 Oil Tanks Battery
 O'Hara's Battery
 Orillon Battery
 Parson's Lodge Battery
 Prince Ferdinand's Battery
 Prince George's Battery
 Prince of Wales Batteries
 Prince William's Battery
 Princess Amelia's Battery
 Princess Anne's Battery (Willis's Battery) [San Joaquin, San Jose]
 Princess Caroline's Battery
 Princess Charlotte's Battery
 Princess Royal's Battery (Queen Anne's/Queen's Battery)
 Queen's Battery
 Queen Charlotte's Battery
 Raglan's Battery
 Reclamation Battery
 Rock Gun Battery
 Rooke Battery
 Rosia Batteries
 Saluting Battery
 Scud Hill Battery
 Signal Hill Battery
 Sir Herbert Miles Promenade (Columbine Battery)
 South Batteries
 Spur Battery
 Spyglass Battery
 St. George's Battery
 Tovey Battery
 Tower Battery
 Upper Battery
 Victoria Battery
 Waterport Battery
 West Battery
 White Rock Battery
 Willis' Battery
 Windmill Hill Batteries
 Woodford's Battery
 Zoca Flank Battery, 1879

Castles
 Moorish Castle

Curtain walls
 Charles V Wall
 Line Wall Curtain
 Montagu Curtain
 Moorish Wall
 Wellington Front

Ditches
 Landport Ditch
 Southport Ditch

Gates
 Algeciras Gate
 Barcina Gate
 Granada Gate
 Grand Casemates Gates (Water Gate) Puerta de la Mar
 Landport (Puerta de Tierra/España)
 Prince Edward's Gate (Puerta de África)
 Queen's Gate
 Ragged Staff Gates
 Southport Gates, 1552 (Puerta de Carlos V)

Magazines
 Eliott's Magazine
 Europa Sunken Magazine
 Flat Bastion Magazine
 Grand Magazine
 Willis' Magazine
 Ragged Staff Magazine

Moles
 Detached Mole
 North Mole
 South Mole
 Rosia Mole

Tunnels
 Admiralty Tunnel
 Great North Road
 Great Siege Tunnels (Upper Galleries)
 Landport Tunnel
 William's Way
 Windsor Gallery

Watchtowers
 Devil's Tower
 Giralda Tower
 O'Hara's Tower (O'Hara's Folly, where O'Hara's Battery now stands)
 Stanley's Clock Tower
 Tower of Homage
 Tuerto Tower
 Remains of a medieval tower (Remnant visible in an underground garage in Line Wall Road)

Other
 Caledonian Canal
 Chatham Counterguard, 1823
 Flêche
 Forbes' Barrier
 Glacis
 Healy's Mortar
 Inundation
 King's Lines
 Montagu Counterguard
 Old Mole
 Ragged Staff Flank
 New Mole (South Mole)
 Prince Albert's Front, 1842
 Prince's Lines
 Queen's Lines
 Salto del Lobo (Peregil)
 West Place of Arms

References

Gibraltar-related lists
Gibraltar